Second Abidjan Bridge is a road bridge over the Ébrié Lagoon which links the two halves of the city of Abidjan in Côte d'Ivoire.

The structure is a girder bridge, hollow box bridge with ten spans, two spans of 35 m and eight spans of 58 m each thus resulting a total length of 592 m.

References

External links
 

Bridges in Ivory Coast
Bridges completed in 1964
Bridges completed in 1967
Buildings and structures in Abidjan
Transport in Abidjan